The 2012 MotoGP World Championship season was the 64th F.I.M. Road Racing World Championship season. Casey Stoner started the season as the defending World Champion, while Honda was the defending Manufacturers' Champion.

In the premier MotoGP class, the championship battle revolved around Yamaha rider Jorge Lorenzo and Honda pairing Dani Pedrosa and defending champion Stoner. Lorenzo won four of the first six races to be held in the campaign to open up an advantage over Stoner, before he was taken out of the Dutch TT on the first lap by Álvaro Bautista; Stoner won the race to eradicate the points lead. In the next race, Stoner crashed out of the German Grand Prix on the final lap and allowed Pedrosa to take his first win of the season. Stoner struggled in the next few races – despite a victory at the United States Grand Prix – with his championship challenge ended by a qualifying crash at Indianapolis. After ankle surgery, he returned to the series and won his final race of his career at his home race, the Australian Grand Prix, for the sixth successive season. Pedrosa went on a run of five victories in six races, with the streak being interrupted by a first-lap crash at Misano, where he was taken out by Héctor Barberá. Lorenzo finished second to Pedrosa on each occasion that he had won, and he took advantage of Pedrosa's accident to win at Misano. Lorenzo ultimately won the title with a second-place finish to Stoner in Australia, after Pedrosa had crashed out of the lead early on.

Changes

Class changes

Claiming Rule Teams
In 2012 the MotoGP class saw the introduction of Claiming Rule Teams (CRT) to allow for participation by independent teams with lower budgets. CRTs were given twelve engines per rider, six more than the other teams and more fuel –  instead of  – but were subject to a factory team buying, or "claiming", their engines for €15,000, or €20,000 with the transmission. The sport's governing body received applications from sixteen new teams looking to join the MotoGP class.

Calendar
The following Grands Prix were scheduled to take place in 2012:

The Fédération Internationale de Motocyclisme released an 18-race provisional calendar on 14 September 2011. Another provisional calendar was released three months later, with the Qatar Grand Prix moved forward by a week.

 ‡ = Night race
 † = MotoGP class only
 †† = Saturday race

Calendar changes
 Only the MotoGP class raced during the United States Grand Prix because of a Californian law on air pollution and the contract that had initially been signed prevented the Moto3 and Moto2 classes from racing from when they were still 125cc and 250cc 2-stroke bikes.
 The Czech Republic and Indianapolis Grand Prix swapped places.

Teams and riders
 A provisional entry list was released by the Fédération Internationale de Motocyclisme on 13 January 2012.

All the bikes used Bridgestone tyres.

New entries
In June 2011, the FIM announced that six teams from Moto2 – Interwetten Paddock, Forward Racing, Marc VDS, Kiefer Racing, Speed Master and BQR-Blusens (later renamed Avintia Racing) – had been granted entries to the 2012 grid; two additional entries – Paul Bird Motorsport and Ioda Racing  – announced that they had been accepted to the grid, running under CRT regulations. However, Interwetten Paddock, Marc VDS, and Kiefer Racing were absent from the revised grid released by FIM in January 2012.

Rider changes
 Andrea Dovizioso left Repsol Honda to join Monster Yamaha Tech 3.
 Colin Edwards moved from Monster Yamaha Tech 3 to NGM Mobile Forward Racing.
 Stefan Bradl moved up from Moto2, joining LCR Honda MotoGP.
 Héctor Barberá still rode a Ducati, but he moved from Aspar Team to Pramac Racing Team.
 2011 FIM Superstock 1000 Cup runner-up Danilo Petrucci debuted in the MotoGP category with Came IodaRacing Project.
 Randy de Puniet exchanged with Barberá, entering Power Electronics Aspar from Pramac Racing Team.
 Álvaro Bautista, who lost his place at the retiring Suzuki MotoGP team, joined San Carlo Honda Gresini.
 Iván Silva rode for Avintia Blusens.
 Aleix Espargaró stepped up from Pons Racing in Moto2 to Power Electronics Aspar.
 Michele Pirro was confirmed by San Carlo Honda Gresini, promoted from Moto2 to MotoGP.
 Mattia Pasini debuted from Moto2 with Speed Master.
 Avintia Blusens promoted Yonny Hernández from Moto2 to MotoGP.
 James Ellison returned to MotoGP from the British Superbike Championship, riding for Paul Bird Motorsport.
 Hiroshi Aoyama was moved by Honda to the Superbike World Championship. However, the Japanese rider replaced Yonny Hernández in Valencia.
 Toni Elías returned to Moto2 from LCR Honda MotoGP. During the season, Elías replaced Barberá (injured) for three rounds.
 On 1 September 2011, Loris Capirossi announced his retirement from racing to join the MotoGP Safety Commission.

Results and standings

Grands Prix

Riders' standings
Scoring system
Points were awarded to the top fifteen finishers. A rider had to finish the race to earn points.

Constructors' standings
Scoring system
Points were awarded to the top fifteen finishers. A rider had to finish the race to earn points.
 

 Each constructor got the same number of points as their best placed rider in each race.

Teams' standings
The teams' standings were based on results obtained by regular and substitute riders; wild-card entries were ineligible.

References

External links
 

 
MotoGP
Grand Prix motorcycle racing seasons